Alfred "Al" Ignatius Gagne (10 November 1941 – 11 July 2020), born and died in Duluth, Minnesota, was an American curler.

He was a  champion, bronze medallist and a two-time United States men's champion (1965, 1968).

Awards
 United States Curling Association Hall of Fame: 1994 (with all 1965 world champions team: skip Bud Somerville, third Bill Strum and lead Tom Wright).

Teams

References

External links
 
Curling Superiority!: A History of Superior Wisconsin's Championship Curling Club - Google Books (p. 49)
OOOH, WHAT A DRAWING GAME! | Vault - Sports Illustrated

American male curlers
World curling champions
American curling champions
1941 births
2020 deaths